Reykjavík Museum of Photography, in Reykjavík, Iceland, preserves about five million photographs by professional and amateur photographers, from around 1870 to the present century. The collection includes studio portraits, and industrial, advertising, press, landscape and family photographs.

History 
The museum began in 1981 from a private collection and was originally called Ljósmyndasafnið hf. Its name was changed to the Reykjavík Museum of Photography in 1987, when the city of Reykjavík took over its operations. Since 2000, the museum has been at Tryggvagata, in the same building as the Reykjavik city library.
 
From 2014, the museum has been merged with three other museums belonging to Reykjavík: Vikin Maritime Museum, Minjasafn Reykjavíkur (the Settlement Exhibition and Árbær Open Air Museum) and Viðey. Two historical museums, Árbæjarsafn and Reykjavík 871±2, also belong to this consortium.

Activities 
The museum's aim is to "awaken the widest possible interest in the cultural role of photography".

The museum nominates Icelandic photographers for the following awards: 
 
 Hasselblad Award
 Leopold Godowsky Jr. Color Photography Award
 Deutsche Börse Photography Prize

The museum has published a number of books.

In 2014 the museum was named one of "The ten best free museums in Europe" in The Guardian.

Collection

The museum collects photographs and other material related to photographers of the Reykjavík area. It also acquires and preserves photographs, albums and other items of vernacular photographic culture.

Exhibitions 
Each year, the museum holds about three main exhibitions and more than ten smaller shows.

A few highlights from previous exhibitions:
 Henri Cartier-Bresson – Paris (2001)
 Mary Ellen Mark – American Odyssey (2002)
 Viggo Mortensen – Skovbo (2008)
 André Kertész – Ma France (2010)
 Marc Riboud – 50 years of photography (2011)
 Ragnar Axelsson – Mirror of Life (2014)
 Lauren Greenfield – Girl Culture (2014–2015)
 Thomas Kellner – Black and White (2017)

Notes

References

External links 

 The museum's website
 Minjasafn Reykjavíkur website
 Photographs from the collection on Fotoweb and Flickr
 The photo of the week from the collection 
 A video introduction to the Reykjavík Museum of Photography, YouTube 

Art museums and galleries in Iceland
Icelandic photography organizations
Photography museums and galleries
Museums in Reykjavík